is a toll road in Ōita Prefecture. It is owned and operated by the West Nippon Expressway Company (NEXCO West Japan). The route is signed E97 under Ministry of Land, Infrastructure, Transport and Tourism's  "2016 Proposal for Realization of Expressway Numbering."

Junction list
The entire expressway is in Ōita Prefecture. 

|colspan="8" style="text-align: center;"|Through to

See also

Japan National Route 10

References

External links
 West Nippon Expressway Company

Toll roads in Japan
Roads in Ōita Prefecture